Anthony Kemp may refer to:
Anthony Fenn Kemp (1763–1868), Australian soldier, merchant and judge
Anthony Kemp (historian) (1939–2018), English historian
Tony Kemp (rugby league) (born 1968), New Zealand rugby league footballer
Tony Kemp (baseball) (born 1991), American baseball player
Tony Kemp (nurse), English nurse